Kim So-hyun (born June 4, 1999), is a South Korean actress and one of the highest-paid actresses in South Korea. She began her entertainment career as a child artist in 2006 and gained public recognition for playing a young villainous queen-to-be in the Korean historical drama Moon Embracing the Sun (2012) and a teen girl who falls into tragedy in Missing You (2013). She received positive critical acclaim for taking on her first lead role in playing dual roles in teen drama Who Are You: School 2015 (2015). Since then, she has starred in many television series including horror comedy Hey Ghost, Let's Fight (2016), historical melodrama The Emperor: Owner of the Mask (2017), romantic comedies Radio Romance (2018) and The Tale of Nokdu (2019), teen suspense romance Love Alarm (2019 & 2021) and Korean folklore River Where the Moon Rises as an avenger.

Film

Television series

Web series

Variety show

Hosting

Theatre

Narration

Music video appearances

References

External links
 

K
South Korean filmographies